Kashin (November 1968 – 24 August 2009) was an Asian elephant who spent most of her life at Auckland Zoo in Auckland, New Zealand. She arrived from Como Zoo in the United States in 1973 and remained at Auckland Zoo until her death.

She was famous for being sponsored by ASB Bank, and featured in the New Zealand produced television programme The Zoo.

She was euthanised on 24 August 2009 due to chronic arthritis and foot abscesses.

See also
 List of individual elephants

References

1968 animal births
2009 animal deaths
Individual elephants